Argiolestinae is a subfamily of damselflies. They belong to the flatwing damselfly family, Argiolestidae. Like their relatives but unlike damselflies of other families, they usually spread their hindwings horizontally when resting. It is the largest subfamily in Argiolestidae, making up almost three-quarters of the family's species, found primarily in Australia, New Guinea, and New Caledonia.

Genera
The following genera are placed in the Argiolestinae:

Footnotes

Megapodagrionidae
Taxa named by Frederic Charles Fraser
Insect subfamilies